Clarkson is an unincorporated community in southwestern Middleton Township, Columbiana County, Ohio, United States, clustered around the intersection of Clarkson and Sprucevale roads. For most of the 19th century, until the founding of Negley and Rogers, Clarkson was the most prominent settlement in Middleton Township.

History
Clarkson was platted in February 1816 by Robert Hanna, who moved there in a conestoga wagon with his wife. It was surveyed by William Heald. Hanna built and resided in a log tavern at the intersection of two roads. This building was later known as the Edward McGinnis tavern.

In 1817, James Monroe, while President of the United States, visited his cousin, Catherine Hanna, in Clarkson. A post office was established in Clarkson in 1833 and remained until 1935. By 1879, Clarkson had two churches, three stores, and about 30 houses.

An early settler and businessman was Milo Warrick who, in 1840, was a cabinet maker and undertaker in Clarkson. His son, Clement Vlandingham Warrick, opened a general store in Clarkson in 1885. He established the first Standard Oil dealership in Ohio, holding vendor's license Number 1.

Bank robber Pretty Boy Floyd was shot and killed by FBI agents in a corn field near Clarkson in 1934.

Geography
Clarkson is located at  (40.7470065, -80.6134048). The majority of residences are clustered at the intersection of Clarkson and Sprucevale Roads (County Highways 426 and 428).

Local attractions
Gaston's Mill, named for Clarkson resident Philander Gaston, lies within Beaver Creek State Park. The mill was built in 1837 and has been restored.

Notable people
 Clement Vlandingham Warrick – first standard oil dealer in Ohio
 Almira Park – mother of Hannah Milhous Nixon and maternal grandmother of President Richard Nixon

References

Unincorporated communities in Columbiana County, Ohio
Unincorporated communities in Ohio
1816 establishments in Ohio
Populated places established in 1816